Laurențiu Nicolae Marinescu (born 25 August 1984) is a Romanian former footballer who played as a midfielder and currently he is a fitness coach at Petrolul Ploiești.

International career
Laurențiu Marinescu played one friendly game at international level for Romania, when coach Victor Pițurcă introduced him at half-time to replace Dorin Goga in a 4–0 victory against Turkmenistan played in January 2012.

Honours
Petrolul Ploiești
Divizia B: 2002–03
Cupa României: 2012–13
Supercupa României Runner-up: 2013
Steaua București
Cupa României: 2010–11
FC Voluntari
Cupa României: 2016–17
Supercupa României: 2017

References

External links

Sportspeople from Ploiești
1984 births
Living people
Romanian footballers
Romania international footballers
Association football midfielders
Liga I players
Liga II players
FC Petrolul Ploiești players
FC Unirea Urziceni players
FC Steaua București players
FC Universitatea Cluj players
FC Dunărea Călărași players
FC Voluntari players
CS Mioveni players